Warhill High School is a public high school operated by the Williamsburg-James City County Public Schools (WJCC). Serving the joint school division of the independent city of Williamsburg and James City County, Virginia, the school is located at 4615 Opportunity Way, in the Lightfoot area of the county.

Communities within the Warhill High attendance zone include: a small portion of the Williamsburg city limits, and the community of Norge.

Historic site
The entire Historic Triangle area of the Virginia Peninsula is steeped in history dating back to the era of the British Colony of Virginia (1607–1776) and later. West of the colonial capital (now Colonial Williamsburg), the old stage coach road to New Kent County and Richmond (which became U.S. Route 60 in the 1920s), as well as Centerville and Longhill roads, all date to the pre-Revolutionary War period. The area where Lightfoot is now was known as the location of Six Mile Ordinary. (An ordinary was a colonial-era tavern with food and lodging for travelers and their horses).

By tradition, the land at War Hill (or as it came to be called, Warhill) is named for an American Revolutionary War battle which took place there on June 26, 1781, between British troops under Lord Cornwallis and Allied forces under the Marquis Lafayette. Nearly 150 men were killed or wounded in the conflict, which occurred during the campaign that led to the victory at Yorktown, establishing independence for Virginia and the United States.

By the late 20th century, the  Warhill tract was one of the largest undeveloped parcels of land in the area. In 1996, it was purchased for public use. Located on Centerville Road near the interchange of U.S. Route 60 and State Route 199, the land was envisioned as multi-purpose in James City County's "Master Plan." In 1999, the Warhill Sports Complex opened adjacent to the site of the new high school. In 2005, construction began on the new Warhill High School.

School history

Warhill High School is Williamsburg-James City County's third high school, the newest since Jamestown High School's completion in 1997. The construction of Warhill was in response to the overcrowding issue at both Jamestown and Lafayette High School. Serious talks about building a third high school began in 2001. In April 2007, Jamestown was reported to be about 350 students over the effective capacity, and Lafayette even more.

Warhill High School opened to the public on August 28, 2007, and opened for the first day of school on September 4, 2007, when 707 students were enrolled at Warhill High School; the number has risen consistently since the opening and is expected to continue to rise so as the surrounding community continues to grow. The school currently has about 1,150 students.

Career and Technical Education Center
When it opened in 2007, the  facility at Warhill High School included a new state-of-the-art technology specialty center, offering Career and Technical Education (CTE) in the following career clusters: 
Health, Human and Public Services€
Electronics, Engineering and Scientific Technology
Information Technology and Communication

Students from all three WJCC high schools are eligible to attend the new Career and Technical Education (CTE) courses at Warhill, which are offered in partnership with Sentara Health System, which opened the modern Sentara Williamsburg Regional Medical Center nearby in Lightfoot in August 2006, and Thomas Nelson Community College.

The Pathways Project
The Pathways Project is a new, innovative way of learning that began for freshmen in the 2016-17 school year. The program accepted around 100 freshman and is currently only available for Warhill High, however, other WJCC high schools may also adopt a similar program in the future. Students who were not zoned for Warhill High could also have joined the program. Students in the project were given a laptop at the beginning of the year to use during the blended learning courses. Students joining the project could choose only two electives, either yearlong or semester. The Pathways Project offers multiple semester long courses including Physics by Design and Humanities by Design. In the Physics by Design course, students have both Physics and Math blended into two blocks and also take a fully online math course. In the Humanities by Design course, students have History and English blended together into two blocks and also take a blended English class. Freshman in the Pathways Project take only one SOL for Math. Students in either course experience project-based learning, teaching the students to collaborate. The Pathways Project was designed for students to be better prepared for the work force.

Band Program
The Warhill Band program is currently under the direction of Tim Fary Jr. The founding director at Warhill was T. Jonathan Hargis followed by Hunter Kopczynski. When Warhill first opened the band was made up of 49 members, with the majority of the students coming from Lafayette High School under the redistricting of James City County.  The band has since grown to 130 members and the achievements and reputation of the program continue to rise.  The band has competed well in recent years and was named a Virginia Honor Band for the 2010–11, 2013–14, 2016-2017, 2017-2018, and 2018-2019 school years. The Warhill Bands include the Marching Lions, Wind Ensemble, Symphonic Band, two jazz ensembles and a percussion ensemble. In addition, the band has chamber ensembles for various functions, color guard, and collaborates with the Warhill Orchestra to pull members to play in the spring musical pit orchestra. In addition, members of the band are afforded full orchestra experiences each year as select members of the band combine with the string orchestra to perform works for full symphony orchestra each spring.

Directors
T. Jonathan Hargis (2007-2012)
Hunter Kopczynski (2011-2017)
David Enloe (2017–2022)
Tim Fary Jr (2022-present)

Orchestra Program 
The Warhill Orchestra Program is under the direction of Lauren Bristow. They are well known for winning competitions as an orchestra as well as individual students. Many students make careers with the knowledge they gain from the Orchestral program at Warhill. Warhill Orchestra offers two different ensembles, the Honors Orchestra and the Advanced Orchestra. There are also chamber ensembles which play for weddings and special events. Warhill orchestra combines with the band to create a full symphony orchestra, as well as participates in the spring musical pit orchestra.

Choir Program
The Warhill Choir program is under the direction of Emily Evans. The choir program is vibrant and growing with several different choirs to fit the interest and talents of different levels of students.

Theatre
Warhill High School follows a WJCC district tradition by performing a fall play, a competition piece, and a spring musical. The inaugural play Cut! was performed November 16 and 17, 2007. Cut! is a glimpse into the often surreal life of the actor; each actor portraying up to 7 characters throughout the play. The premiere musical was Beauty and the Beast (musical) performed March 13–16, 2008. Both shows were directed by Robert Cannon. The most recent musical was "Tarzan", directed by Christina Marshburn. Warhill High School's theatre department is well known and successful, placing in the top six schools at the Virginia Theatre Association's Secondary School Competition in 2016 and 2017. Warhill Theatre is directed by Jacob Noble.

Directors
Robert Cannon (2007–2008)

Mr. Cannon brings 23 years of theatre experience to Warhill. His background spans 4 states, more than 50 shows, and 14 different venues. Highlights of his career include Actors Equity Stage Manager for Arizona Theatre Company and Northern Arizona University Summer Theatre, Production Coordinator for the UPN television series Legend, summers at Utah Shakespearean Festival and Colorado Shakespeare Festival. Other roles Mr. Cannon has performed in the theatre include assistant director, technical director, actor, and tour manager. He holds a B.F.A. in Theatrical Production/Stage Management from the University of Arizona in Tucson and an M.Ed. from Northern Arizona University in Flagstaff.
Previously, he was the director at James Blair Middle School where he created the theatre program and introduced the 'Shakespeare in the Spring' series. The Series included Taming of the Shrew, Hamlet, A Midsummer Night's Dream, and Julius Caesar. Other shows produced at James Blair include Little Shop of Horrors (musical), School House Rock Live Jr., The Outsiders, and The Legend of Sleepy Hollow.

Beth Wigley (2008–2012)

Mrs. Wigley brings tremendous energy to the WHS Theatre Department as well as a background in Acting/Directing. Formerly the Theatre Director at Jamestown High School and the Director of Theatre for York County's School of the Arts for 13 years, her first production at Warhill was Neil Simon's Rumors. The spring (2008–09) musical was You're a Good Man, Charlie Brown. Mrs. Wigley has both acted and directed for The Williamsburg Players, local television commercials, and worked with the Virginia Shakespeare Festival. Her focus both on the theatre and youth is represented in her summer workshops.
Mrs. Wigley's directing credits at Jamestown include A Midsummer Night's Dream, A Chorus Line, and Museum.
Her directing credits at Warhill includes The Wizard of Oz, and A Funny Thing Happened on the Way to the Forum.

Jessica Grant (2012-2017)

Christina Marshburn (2017–2022)
Jake Noble (2022-present)

Athletics
The school's athletic teams compete in the AA Bay Rivers District in Region I.
Warhill High School fields teams in these sports:

Swimming
Baseball
Basketball
Cross-Country
Field Hockey
Football (won their first game against New Kent in 2009)
Golf
Indoor Track and Field (Always goes to state)
Outdoor Track and Field (Always goes to state)
Soccer - The 2011 spring season girls soccer team became the school's first team in any sport to win a District championship, a Regional championship, and host a state quarterfinal game. First undefeated regular season, 70 goals for and 4 against. The team also had the first District/Regional player of the year (Ashley Williams) and first District/Regional coach of the year (Mike Giblin).
Softball
Tennis
Volleyball - 2014 3A State Champions
Wrestling

References

Educational institutions established in 2007
Public high schools in Virginia
Schools in James City County, Virginia
2007 establishments in Virginia